Abdelmalek Rahou (b. March 17, 1986 - Algier) is an Algerian boxer who competed at the 2012 Olympics at Middleweight.

At the Olympic qualifier (results) he won two bouts and qualified in spite of being edged out by Mujandjae Kasuto.
In London 2012 (results) he beat the Australian Jesse Ross then lost to eventual champion Ryōta Murata 12:21.

References

External links
AIBA Bio

1986 births
Living people
Middleweight boxers
Boxers at the 2012 Summer Olympics
Olympic boxers of Algeria
People from Algiers
Algerian male boxers
21st-century Algerian people